Tobias Björn Bacherle (born 18 October 1994) is a German politician representing Alliance 90/The Greens. He was elected to the Bundestag in the 2021 German federal election.

Life and education 
Born in Herrenberg, Bacherle grew up in Sindelfingen.

Before his election to the Bundestag, Bacherle worked as a political advisor to the MEP Michael Bloss.

He is the co-founder of the voluntary organisation Dit is schade, which aims to promote local culture in Sindelfingen.

Political career 
Bacherle was elected to the town council of Sindelfingen in 2014, and became the chairperson of the Alliance 90/The Greens group in 2019.  

From 2014 to 2015, he was speaker for the Green Youth in the district of Böblingen, and from 2016 to 2019 a member of the executive committee of the Green Youth in Baden-Württemberg. 

In the German federal elections of 2017 and 2021, Bacherle ran as a direct candidate in the electoral district of Böblingen, where he lost both times to Marc Biadacz. In 2021, however, he was elected to the Bundestag through the Baden-Württemberg party list of Alliance 90/The Greens, having been appointed 10th place.

In addition to his committee assignments, Bacherle is part of the German Parliamentary Friendship Group for Relations with the Maghreb States.

References

External links 
 Official site (in German)
 Biography on the website of Alliance 90/The Greens in Sindelfingen (in German)

Living people
1994 births
21st-century German politicians
Alliance 90/The Greens politicians
Members of the Bundestag for Baden-Württemberg
Members of the Bundestag 2021–2025
People from Herrenberg